The 2021–22 Michigan State Spartans women's basketball team represented Michigan State University during the 2021–22 NCAA Division I women's basketball season. The Spartans, led by fifteenth year head coach Suzy Merchant, played their home games at the Breslin Center in East Lansing, Michigan as members of the Big Ten Conference.

They finished the season 15–15, 8–9 in Big Ten play to finish in eighth place.  As the seventh seed in the Big Ten tournament they defeated Purdue in the Second Round and Indiana in the Quarterfinals before losing to Iowa in the Semifinals.  They were not invited to the NCAA tournament or the WNIT.

Previous season 
The Spartans finished the season 15–9, 8–7 in Big Ten play to finish in eighth place.  As the eighth seed in the Big Ten tournament they defeated Purdue in the Second Round before losing to Ohio State in the Quarterfinals.  They received and at-large bid to the NCAA tournament where they were the ten seed in the Mercado Regional.  They lost in the first round to seven seed Iowa State to end their season.

Roster

Schedule and results

Source:

|-
!colspan=6 style=| Exhibition

|-
!colspan=6 style=| Regular season

|-
!colspan=6 style=|Big Ten tournament

Rankings

The Coaches Poll did not release a Week 2 poll and the AP Poll did not release a poll after the NCAA Tournament.

References

Michigan State
Michigan
Michigan
Michigan State Spartans women's basketball seasons